, or "floating drop," is one of the traditional forty throws of Judo as developed by Jigoro Kano. It belongs to the fourth group, Dai Yonkyo, of the traditional throwing list, Gokyo-no-Nagewaza , of Kodokan Judo. It is also part of the current 67 Throws of Kodokan Judo.  The technique is categorized as a hand technique, Te-waza.

Technical description

In free fight and tournaments, this throw is rarely done in his basic form, as seen in Kata. When uke is off balance the pulling hand at the sleeve of tori guides Uke towards the ground, without an additional force and help from legs or hips, making in 100% a hand technique(Te-Waza).

In yaku soku geiko, randori of free fighting variations can be seen by pulling at the lapels. Often they are counters to actions of Uke. When Uke overcommits in hipthrows (goshi-waza), Tori can defend by stepping to the side (tai sabaki) to avoid the throw and during that action Tori can pull at the sleeves or lapel (depending the side of grip and side of the tai sabaki), further breaking the balance of Uke, enforcing the kuzushi (losing of balance) and guiding Uke to the ground. Same principle is used in Uchi Mata Sukachi.

Similar techniques, variants, and aliases 
English aliases:
 floating drop

Similar techniques:
sumi otoshi: backwards oriented
Uchi mata sukachi: a counter to uchi mata in a similar way to the execution of Uki otoshi.

Judo technique
Throw (grappling)